Barisal Government Women's College is a master's degree college in Barisal, Bangladesh. It was established in 1957 and nationalized in 1987. The college has over 3,600 students and eight honours level subjects.

Notable alumni
 Kaberi Gayen, academic, author, and social activist

References

Colleges in Barisal District
Colleges affiliated to National University, Bangladesh
Barishal District
Educational institutions established in 1957
1957 establishments in East Pakistan
Women's universities and colleges in Bangladesh